Bridgeville is a borough in Allegheny County in the U.S. state of Pennsylvania. The population was 4,804 at the 2020 census.

Geography

McLaughlin Run, a tributary to Chartiers Creek, flows through Bridgeville.

Surrounding communities
Bridgeville has three borders with the townships of Collier to the north and northwest, South Fayette to the west and southwest, and Upper St. Clair to the south, southeast and east.

History
The village that eventually became Bridgeville acquired its name because of the first bridge built at the crossing of Chartiers Creek at the south end of what is now Washington Avenue.

The area was originally named St. Clair Township in 1763, and the southern part was split off as Upper St. Clair Township in 1806.  For nearly 100 years, Bridgeville was a village within Upper St. Clair Township, known for its one bridge over Chartiers Creek where people frequently met to trade goods.  An old saying, "Meet me at the bridge," provided an obvious name for the village that began to develop north of the bridge around 1830.

Mining operations began in the 1880s, prompting growth. Bridgeville was officially incorporated as a borough on July 27, 1901, from Upper St. Clair Township.

A mass shooting took place on August 4, 2009, in an LA Fitness health club near Bridgeville in Collier Township. The attack resulted in four deaths, including that of the perpetrator, who took his own life. Nine other people were injured.

Demographics

As of the census of 2000, there were 5,341 people, 2,539 households, and 1,444 families residing in the borough. The population density was 4,938.5 people per square mile (1,909.4/km2). There were 2,656 housing units at an average density of 2,455.9 per square mile (949.5/km2). The racial makeup of the borough was 94.05% White, 4.42% African American, 0.09% Native American, 0.37% Asian, 0.34% from other races, and 0.73% from two or more races. Hispanic or Latino of any race were 0.77% of the population.

There were 2,539 households, out of which 20.8% had children under the age of 18 living with them, 43.6% were married couples living together, 10.1% had a female householder with no husband present, and 43.1% were non-families. 39.5% of all households were made up of individuals, and 21.4% had someone living alone who was 65 years of age or older. The average household size was 2.09 and the average family size was 2.81.

In the borough the population was spread out, with 18.0% under the age of 18, 5.6% from 18 to 24, 28.4% from 25 to 44, 22.2% from 45 to 64, and 25.8% who were 65 years of age or older. The median age was 44 years. For every 100 females, there were 86.9 males. For every 100 females age 18 and over, there were 82.3 males.

The median income for a household in the borough was $34,873, and the median income for a family was $46,500. Males had a median income of $35,461 versus $25,527 for females. The per capita income for the borough was $19,500. About 5.6% of families and 7.8% of the population were below the poverty line, including 6.6% of those under age 18 and 12.0% of those age 65 or over.

Government and politics

Education
Bridgeville is served by the Chartiers Valley School District.  The public school serves students from Bridgeville, Collier, Scott, and Heidelberg.

Notable people
 Paul Danilo, member of the Soccer Hall of Fame
 Nicholas DiOrio, member of the Soccer Hall of Fame
 C.J. Henderson, author
 Eric Kush, NFL player
 T. J. McConnell, NBA player
 Ron Sams, NFL player
 Harold Stephens, writer and novelist
 Justin Watson, NFL player

References

External links

 Borough of Bridgeville official website
 Brief History of Bridgeville

Boroughs in Allegheny County, Pennsylvania
Populated places established in 1830
Pittsburgh metropolitan area
1901 establishments in Pennsylvania